is a Japanese anime television series directed by Shinichiro Kimura. It premiered on TV Tokyo on April 6, 2008. A manga adaptation was serialized in Kerokero Ace. It is also streamed in the United States on Crunchyroll under the title Web Ghosts PiPoPa since December 2008. An English language pilot was produced by William Winckler Productions in 2017.

A spin-off game entitled  was also released for the Nintendo DS.

Pipopa is an onomatopoeia of computer beeps.

Overview
The story is about a boy, Yūta Akikawa, who is afraid of computers. His family moves to Kamimai City, a technologically advanced city, where his mother works. The same day, he receives a mysterious encrypted message from an anonymous source. When he opens this, he is transported into the Net World, meeting three Web Ghosts known as Pit, Pot, and Pat. Here, the three Web Ghosts, whom Yūta dubs as PiPoPa, explain to Yūta that the Net World is what is going on inside of all outside computers, cell phones, and all technology. Yūta decides to hide this discovery from his friends and family, and he uses this to his advantage to help any friend in need and save technological breakdowns, mishaps, and overloads.

Characters
  
 Yūta is a school boy who is afraid of computers, but is fond of astronomy. One day, he was sucked inside his cellphone where he met Pit, Pot and Pat. As his adventure continues, he protects the Web World along with PiPoPa.

  
 Hikaru is the first person that Yūta met in Kamimai City. She is the one who mostly shows Yūta how things go around in Kamimai. They became classmates in school. Eventually, Hikaru managed to get Yuta to allow her to go to the Web World. Her Web Ghost is Ecolon.

  
 Pit is a show-offy net ghost who can transform into a car, a plane, a UFO, a stamper (under the right conditions) and various other things. Pit, along with Pot and Pat hate to be called PiPoPa, but Pit is the one who hates it most.

  
 Pot is a net ghost who always likes to eat. He also has the most affection towards girls. He has been helpful on many occasions, and claims he can also shift his hands into a stamper similar to Pit. However, it is unknown if the effect can be replicated.

  
 Pat is the computer freak in the group, calculating many things. He is the one that finds the "virus core" in Web Monsters.

  
 Project Siren is a top secret project hidden inside the Dream Future facility in Kamimai. She escapes and becomes friends with the PiPoPa trio. It is later known that she is not the original, and there was one before her.

  
 Mamoru is one of the best friends of Yūta. He taught him the basics of computers, and he is a computer programming expert. It is later revealed that Divine Forest was Mamoru, in a sense.

  
 Kazushige is a bully at school and one of Yūta's classmates. He has a crush on Hikaru and Sayaka plus he also becomes frustrated when Yūta gets close to either of them. Kazushige eventually catches  and Yuta going to the Web World. He is also "Dynagon", a poet that Hikaru adores. Kazushige's Web Ghosts are Bit, Bot, and Bat.

   and  
 Kazushige's friends and underlings.

  
 Web Venus is a very mysterious web ghost who frequently appears near Pit, Pot and Pat. Apparently, she defends peace in the Web World but works only by herself. Web Venus is actually Sayaka, using an avatar achieved by a web diving machine. 

  
 A photographer, Kenta is Yūta's father.

  
 A programmer at Dream Future Japan, Yūko is Yūta's mother.

  
 Juzo is Hikaru's grandfather and is very protective of Hikaru. He also specializes in the internet. He rejects the ideas of Dream Future. It is also notable that he is addicted to pudding.

  (and  )
 BiBoBa has been the mortal rivals of PiPoPa, although they team up later. Like their rivals, they hate to be called BiBoBa. 
  
 Kazama is the president of the Dream Future Japanese branch.

  
 Sakamoto works under Kazama as time manager. She remains faithful to Kazama even after he was fired.

  
 A no-good man, Hirame worked as a chief in Dream Future. After Kazama was fired, he was assigned as the president.

  
 She is a friend of Hikaru. In one episode, Hikaru and Yūta help her set-up the website for Karin's inn.

  
 A seemingly poor person looking for a permanent job. He seems to be a bit computer literate. Undercover, he is a member of the internet police. He has developed feelings for Yūta and Hikaru's teacher Eriko.

  
 The young-at-heart homeroom teacher of Yūta's homeroom class. In privacy, she takes on the role of a net idol named EriEri.

  
 An ecology focused net ghost. He is the net ghost of Hikaru's favorite website. Without him, Hikaru cannot net dive (in the same way as with Yūta and Pi Po Pa) unless with someone else who can net dive (as seen in episode 13).

  
 A Russian transfer student. She can speak Russian and some Japanese. By the end of the series she can say more Japanese than she did at the beginning. She is also Web Venus,achieved through a web diving machine.

  
 Sayaka's mother who looks like Web Venus. She was a former assistant at Dream Future and a friend of Juzo in research.

 The Dream Future Big Four
 A special division in Dream Future made purely of data.
  
 The head of the American branch, Ash specializes in throwing cards.
 
 The head of the Asian branch, Langa is able to hypnotize.
 
 The head of the European branch.
  
 The head of the North African branch.
  
 The founder of Dream Future and grandfather of Mamoru. After a mysterious accident, Doctor Forest went ill and was sent to the hospital and has never woken up since.

  
 A person who forcibly became the leader of the Dream Future Big Four. He has the ability to turn web ghosts into web monsters.

Theme songs 
 Opening songs
  by Atsuko Bungo (episodes 2-4)
 "Get On Up" by Sugimoto Shimai (5-26)
  by COON (27-50)
 Ending songs
  by COON (1-26)
  by Sugimoto Shimai (27-50)

Reception 
Famicom Tsūshin scored the game a 18 out of 40, making it one of the lowest rated Nintendo DS games of that year.

References

External links
 

2008 manga
Television shows about virtual reality
Anime series
Anime with original screenplays
Shōnen manga
TV Tokyo original programming